Jaakko Syrjä (7 March 1926 – 22 May 2022) was a Finnish writer. He served as the president of the Union of Finnish Writers from 1975 to 1980.

Biography 
Syrjä was born in Pälkäne, the son of Martta née Niemiö and Juho Nestori Syrjä, who were both cattle traders and farmers. At the age of seven, he and his family moved from Hirsilä to Korkeakoski. Syrjä then moved to Tampere, where he worked for the railroad equipment and steam locomotive manufacturing company Lokomo. In 1953 his story "There came the Bear" win Best Short Story in the Pirkanmaa Writing Competition.

He later worked as an editor for Gummerus and WSOY. Syrjä was a member of the Union of Finnish Writers from 1970 to 1975, and president from 1975 to 1980. He worked with novelist Kalle Päätalo adapting works for publication. Syrjä was a member of the Väinö Linna Society.

Syrjä won the City of Tampere Literature Prize three times from 1956 to 1988. He also was a winner of the Thanks for the Book Award in 1966. Syrjä was nominated for the Finlandia Prize in 1988. He was a winner of the Väinö Linna Prize in 2005. In 2016, Syrjä was awarded the Pirkanmaa Art Prize by the Pirkanmaa Arts Council.

Syrjä died of COVID-19 in May 2022, aged 96, at a care home in Ylöjärvi.

References 

1926 births
2022 deaths
People from Pälkäne
Deaths from the COVID-19 pandemic in Finland
20th-century Finnish male writers
Thanks for the Book Award winners